The Milan S Lines constitute the commuter rail system serving the metropolitan area of Milan, Italy.
The system comprises 11 lines serving 124 stations, for a total length of 403 km. 
There are 415 trains per day with a daily ridership of about 230,000.

The core of the system is the Passante, an underground railway running through the city approximately from the north-west to the south-east. 
Several lines share this track, making the service in the city centre comparable to a metro line or S-Bahn system.

The service timetable is based on a clock-face scheduling. 
Although operated by different companies, the Milan Metro and the suburban rail service have integrated tickets.

Network

Lines in darker background run through the Milan Passante railway.
Lines which share same tracks for the majority of the route are generally identified by similar colors. 
Trains run every 30 minutes in each line, generally from 6 am to 9 pm or midnight depending on the line.

Defunct lines

Stations served

Integrated ticketing

An integrated ticket is used inside the Milan urban area for bus, tram and metro lines, as well as the suburban railway. The urban single journey ticket costs €2.00. Other tickets are available, including 24h and 48h tickets and night ticket. Regional train fares apply outside the urban limit.

Between 2004 and 2007 ATM introduced Itinero smartcard, a proximity card which can be charged with season tickets, replacing paper for this type of tickets in the Milan area. At the beginning of 2010, a new smartcard, RicaricaMi, was introduced. The new card can be charged up with credit and can be used for travel in place of magnetic paper tickets, on the model of London's Oyster card. These cards are also valid on the suburban railway lines.

The suburban railways can be accessed also with the regional integrated ticket "Io viaggio ovunque in Lombardia", as 1 to 7 days tickets or more long subscription with smartcard "Io Viaggio".

Rolling stock
Several train classes are operated on the network. TAF (Treno Alta Frequentazione) class trains were introduced since the end of the 1990s. Trenord is now introducing new Treno Servizio Regionale (TSR) class trains to replace older rolling stock.

History

Full service started on 12 December 2004 with the completion of the Passante and the activation of the first 8 lines. However, a shuttle service was running since 1997 in the partially completed track.

Line S4 was extended from Seveso to Camnago on 19 February 2006. The new Romolo station on line S9 was opened 3 months later. Lines S1, S2, S6 and S10 were extended from Porta Vittoria to the new station of Rogoredo on 15 June 2008.

Two new stations, Pregnana Milanese and Rho Fiera Milano were opened in 2009. Line S8 and S11 began operation at the end of the same year, while the service was extended to reach Lodi and Treviglio.

On 26 March 2011, with the completion of the Milan Metro Line 3 north extension, a new station, Affori, was opened in place of the old one, to be an interchange with the Metro.

On 1 May 2011 a new company, Trenord, was created from the joining of the two main regional train operators in Lombardy, Trenitalia and LeNord. Trenord is since then the operator of most of suburban lines.

Planned extensions
 line S2: extension from Milano Rogoredo to Pieve Emanuele.
 line S8: extension from Milano Porta Garibaldi to Milano Bovisa.
 line S9: extension from Saronno to Busto Arsizio.
 line S13: extension from Milano Bovisa to Garbagnate.

At least five new lines are expected to enter service in the next few years:
 line S14: Magenta - Milano Rogoredo.
 line S15: Parabiago - Milano Rogoredo.
 line S16: Abbiategrasso - Lambrate - Rho.
 line S17: Garbagnate - Garbagnate Ovest - Lainate.
 line S18: Milano Bovisa - Milano Porta Garibaldi - Carnate Usmate - Orio al Serio.

Several new stations are also planned for the Milan urban area: Milano Tibaldi, the renewed Milano Porta Romana and others.

Gallery

See also 

 Transport in Milan
 List of Milan S Lines stations

References

External links 

 
 Trenord - Le linee S
 Line S5

 
Metropolitan City of Milan
Passenger rail transport in Italy